A caver, spelunker, or potholer is someone who participates in caving, the exploration of cave systems

Caver or Cavers may also refer to:

Places
 Cavers, Scottish Borders, a civil parish in the former county of Roxburghshire, Scotland

People
 Quinton Caver (born 1978), American gridiron footballer
 Vivian Caver (born 1928), American politician from Washington state
 Harry Cavers (1909–1995), Canadian politician
 Walter D. Cavers (1888–1955), American politician 
 Archibald Douglas, 13th of Cavers (died 1741), Scottish politician
 William Douglas, of Cavers (died 1748) (c. 1688–1748), Scottish politician

Other
Cavers, the mascot of San Diego High School, formerly Cavemen

See also
 Spelunker (disambiguation)
 Carver (disambiguation)